The Jamaica Fire Brigade (JFB) is a Department of the Ministry of Local Government of Jamaica and is the fire brigade of Jamaica. It was established in Kingston in 1871.

Organization 

The brigade is split into an Administrative Branch and an Operations Branch.

References

External links
Official site

Ministries and agencies of the government of Jamaica
Government agencies established in 1871
Firefighting by country
1871 establishments in Jamaica
Fire departments